Olga Viktorovna Desyatskaya (born May 18, 1987 in Bryansk) is a Russian sport shooter. She won a bronze medal for the 10 m air rifle at the 2008 European Shooting Championships in Winterthur, Switzerland, with a score of 500 points.

Desyatskaya represented Russia at the 2008 Summer Olympics in Beijing, where she competed in the women's 10 m air rifle, along with her teammate Lioubov Galkina, who eventually won the silver medal in the final. She finished only in eighteenth place by one point behind Germany's Barbara Lechner from the third attempt, for a total score of 394 targets.

References

External links
NBC Olympics Profile

Russian female sport shooters
Living people
Olympic shooters of Russia
Shooters at the 2008 Summer Olympics
Sportspeople from Bryansk
1987 births
21st-century Russian women